The following is a list of Bulgarian classical composers.

Romantic
 Emanuil Manolov (1860–1902)

Modern/Contemporary
 Dobri Hristov (1875–1941)
 Petko Staynov (1896–1977)
 Pancho Vladigerov (1899–1978)
 Dimitar Nenov (1901–1953)
 Veselin Stoyanov (1902–1969)
 Marin Goleminov (1908–2000)
 Georgi Tutev (1924–1994)
 Petar Krumov (born 1934)
 Vassil Kazandjiev (born 1934)
 Milcho Leviev (1937–2019)
 Emil Tabakov (born 1947)
 Julia Tsenova (1948–2010)
 Michail Goleminov (born 1956)
 Georgi Arnaoudov (born 1957)
 Anna-Maria Ravnopolska-Dean (born 1960)
 Albena Petrovic-Vratchanska (born 1965)
 Dobrinka Tabakova (born 1980)
 Alexandra Fol (born 1981)

Bulgarian
Composers